David Carlton Wilson (born April 27, 1959) is a former professional American football player who played with the New Orleans Saints of the National Football League (NFL) from 1981 to 1989. A quarterback from the University of Illinois at Urbana–Champaign, Wilson was selected by the Saints with the first selection of the 1981 supplemental draft.

College
Wilson attended Katella High School in Anaheim, California. He had a reputation for a strong arm and quick release, when he received a scholarship from the University of Illinois in the Big Ten Conference.  Wilson had many issues with his NCAA eligibility due to some issues with his transcripts.

The highlight of Wilson's career was in 1980 against Ohio State on November 8, when he threw for 621 yards, an NCAA record that lasted eight years.

Professional
Once again, eligibility issues forced Wilson to declare himself eligible for the supplemental draft on July 7. The New Orleans Saints, under new head coach Bum Phillips, took him with the first pick of that years draft which is great for an athlete , as the heir apparent to longtime starter Archie Manning.

Torn ligaments in his left knee incurred in a preseason game on August 12, 1982, required surgery and ended his year; it affected his mobility for the rest of his career. Wilson spent his entire career with the Saints, until his retirement prior to the 1990 season. Most of his playing time came during the 1985 and 1986 seasons, when he started ten and thirteen games, respectively.

Later life and family
Wilson is currently a scout for NFL Pro Scouts in southern California. He has two sons, who both play football.

References

External links

1959 births
Living people
American football quarterbacks
Illinois Fighting Illini football players
New Orleans Saints players
Players of American football from Anaheim, California